Ali is a village in Georgia, Shida Kartli region, in Khashuri Municipality. The village is located on the right bank of Cheratkhevi river, 25 km to the North-East from Khashuri. The epochal monuments are: Dedaghvtisa, Kviratskhoveli, Usaneti, Janiaurebi churches.

Ali was one of the advanced city of Middle Age Georgia. The reason of this development was its convenient geographical location. Ali advanced is a city in the 11th – 12th centuries due to the famous trade-caravan routes which passed through it and was a historic cross – road of Eastern and Western Georgia. From the North Ali was surrounded by Ali fortress and from the South – by Nabakhtevi fortress. In 18th century Ali was a royal town as well.

According to the historical sources, there was custom-house as well. That indicates that Ali was a trade city and had trading relations with other countries.

Archeological materials indicates that humans dwelled here from late Bronze Age.

Literature 
 ს. მაკალათია, ფრონის ხეობა, თბ., 1963 წ., გვ. 78–85
 ჟ. შარდენი, მოგზაურობა საქართველოში (1672-1673 წ.), თბ., 1935 წ., გვ. 82
 თ. ლაცაბიძე, ხაშურის რაიონის ისტორია ტოპონიმებში, 2000 წ.

Populated places in Shida Kartli